Yellow Studio Works (YSW) is an Indian production house based out of Hyderabad.

About YSW 
YSW is a team of film-makers composed of Jawad Ali, Faiz Rai and Nawaz Ul Hasan Umair. YSW was the first independent film-making group in Hyderabad, India, releasing their short films exclusively on Facebook.

Short films

References

Film production companies based in Hyderabad, India
Indian independent films
Year of establishment missing